Actinocyclidae is a family of sea slugs, dorid nudibranchs, marine gastropod mollusks in the superfamily Doridoidea. This family is within the clade Euctenidiacea.

Taxonomy 
Genera within the family Actinocyclidae include:
 Actinocyclus Ehrenberg, 1831  - the type genus
 Actinocyclus papillatus  (Bergh, 1878)
 Actinocyclus verrucosus  Ehrenberg, 1831
 Hallaxa Eliot, 1909
 Hallaxa albopunctata Gosliner & S. Johnson, 1994
 Hallaxa apefae  Marcus, 1957
 Hallaxa atrotuberculata Gosliner & S. Johnson, 1994
 Hallaxa chani  Gosliner & Williams, 1975
 Hallaxa cryptica  Gosliner & Johnson, 1994
 Hallaxa decorata  Bergh, 1905
 Hallaxa elongata Gosliner & S. Johnson, 1994
 Hallaxa fuscescens  Pease, 1871
 Hallaxa gilva Miller, 1987
 Hallaxa hileenae  Gosliner & Johnson, 1994
 Hallaxa iju  Gosliner & Johnson, 1994
 Hallaxa indecora (Bergh, 1877)
 Hallaxa michaeli  Gosliner & Johnson, 1994
 Hallaxa paulinae  Gosliner & Johnson, 1994
 Hallaxa translucens Gosliner & S. Johnson, 1994

Each genus also has a synonym. Sphaerodoris is a synonym for Actinocyclus and Halla is a synonym for Hallaxa

References

External links